Ectoedemia ortiva is a moth of the family Nepticulidae. It is found in the Russian Far East (Primorskiy Kray). The habitat consists of dense, mostly deciduous forests.

The wingspan is about 5.6 mm. The forewings are grey-brown, with a distinct bronze lustre. The hindwings are fuscous or grey-brown. Adults are on wing in July.

The larvae possibly feed on Quercus species and probably mine the leaves of their host plant.

Etymology
The species is named after the region East Asia. The name is derived from Latin ortivus (meaning the eastern or dawn side).

References

Moths described in 2013
Nepticulidae
Moths of Asia